Newsarama is an American website that publishes news, interviews, and essays about the American comic book industry. It is owned by Future US. In June 2020, Newsarama was merged with the website GamesRadar+, also owned by Future US.

History
Newsarama began in mid-1995 as a series of Internet forum postings on the Prodigy comic book message boards by fan Mike Doran. In the forum postings, Doran shared comic book-related news items he had found across the World Wide Web and, as these postings became more regular and read widely, he gave them the title "Prodigy Comic Book Newswire."

In January 1997, Doran began to post a version of the column titled The Comics Newswire on Usenet's various rec.arts.comics communities. The name of the column evolved to The Newswire, and then to CBI Newsarama, before finally becoming Newsarama in 1998.

The posts quickly became popular due to the speed of reporting via the Internet. This meant Doran could break stories faster than other comic book news sources that appeared in printed publications, as the printed stories had to be fully edited weeks before they were released. By the time other online comic journalists arrived on the scene, Newsarama already had become an established brand. Although the column in its earliest forms reported both news and rumors, it later adopted a standard journalistic news approach.

Doran's postings left Usenet in 1998, becoming a Newsarama column on such websites as Mania.com, AnotherUniverse.com, Fandom.com and Comicon.com. The Newsarama column became a semi-autonomous site, hosted by Kevin Smith's ViewAskew.com network of sites, in August 2002.

Three months later, Doran left Newsarama, which was by now its own website, to take a staff position at Marvel Comics. Matt Brady, a writer who had written extensively for the site, took over. Doran later returned to work at Newsarama, while Brady continued working as primary writer for the site. The site left the ViewAskew.com network and became independent in early April 2006. Newsarama was acquired by the Imaginova corporation in October 2007. When Brady left the site in July 2009, Doran and Lucas Siegel stepped up to run it, with Siegel taking the position of Site Editor. The site was acquired by TopTenREVIEWS in October 2009. After the acquisition, TopTenREVIEWS was rebranded TechMedia Network before eventually becoming Purch Group.

Newsarama has been quoted as a source of comic news by the mainstream media, including The New York Times. In 2006, Entertainment Weekly listed Newsarama as one of its "25 favorite online entertainment sites" in 2006 and as one of its "100 Greatest Websites" in 2007.

Newsarama originally maintained a registered member forum known as talk@Newsarama. In 2010, Newsarama closed down the forum and redirected readers to comment on the site's Facebook page.

Purch's consumer brands, including Newsarama, were acquired by Future US in July 2018.

In June 2020, the Newsarama website lost its domain name and became part of GamesRadar+, another website owned by Future US.

On 2 February 2023, it was announced that Doran had left Newsarama and GamesRadar+.

Columnists
Marvel Comics editor-in-chief Joe Quesada's column "Joe Fridays" (renamed "New Joe Fridays" in 2006 as a joke regarding Marvel's penchant for relaunching titles with the prefix "new") appeared weekly until 2008, when the column moved to MySpace. Quesada then began writing the column "Cup of Joe" on Comic Book Resources. Former DC Comics editor Michael Siglain contributed the weekly "5.2 About 52", and in 2007, DC Executive Editor Dan DiDio announced he would write a column similar to "New Joe Fridays", focusing on the series Countdown. Didio has participated in the weekly "10 Answers and 1 Question" column for the site.

Regular columns have included "Animated Shorts" by Steve Fritz, "Write or Wrong" by Dirk Manning, "Best Shots" by reviewers from ShotgunReviews.com, "10 Answers and 1 Question with Dan DiDio", "Weekly Webbing", "Right to Assemble", covering Marvel's Avengers titles by Troy Brownfield, "Column . . . for JUSTICE" by Brownfield, covering Justice League titles, "Getting Animated" and "Friday Flashback" by Brownfield and "Agent of S.T.Y.L.E." by Alan Kistler, covering the evolution of costumes and designs for different comic book characters. Newsarama has also run a series of "Post Game" columns offering coverage and commentary of popular genre-related television programs on a regular basis. Covered shows include Lost, Smallville, Batman: The Brave and the Bold, Fringe, Flash Forward, and others.

Criticism
In November 2005, Michael Dean, writing in The Comics Journal, studied Internet comic book industry news sources and evaluated Newsarama's journalistic performance. The study praised the site for the depth of coverage provided in some articles, but criticized its reliance on press releases and the "softness" of the questions asked in its interviews. Dean focused on one story in particular, "Diamond Changes Thresholds" by Matt Brady. Though he found the piece qualified as "journalism", Dean also found it: "contained factual inaccuracies, failed to get multiple points of view and sucked up to its corporate subject."

Awards
The site has been the recipient of a number of awards and award nominations, including:
1999 Eagle Award nomination for Favorite Comics-Related Website (professional).
2000 Eagle Award nomination  for Favourite Comics-Related Website (professional).
2004 Eagle Award for Favorite Comics E-Zine.
2005 Eagle Award nomination for Favourite Comics-Related Website.
2006 Eagle Award for Favorite Comics-Related Website.
2007 Eagle Award nomination for Favorite Comics Related Website.
2008 Eisner Award for Best Comics-Related Periodical/Journalism.

References

External links
Newsarama
Alexa site statistics for Newsarama.com

American entertainment news websites
Eisner Award winners for Best Comics-Related Periodical/Journalism
Publications established in 1995
Publications established in 2002
Websites about comics